Hilda Evelyn Buck (27 December 1914 – 10 May 1990) was a New Zealand cricketer who played as a wicket-keeper and right-handed batter. She appeared in one Test match for New Zealand, their first, in 1935. She played domestic cricket for Wellington. She married the Wellington cricketer Jimmy Ell.

References

External links
 
 

1914 births
1990 deaths
Cricketers from Palmerston North
New Zealand women cricketers
New Zealand women Test cricketers
Wellington Blaze cricketers